Lipotrapeza vestiens is a species of sea cucumber in the genus Holothuroidea. The species is found in South Australia, often concealing itself with sand at a depth of at least 12 feet.

References 

Species described in 1914